Biti tu is the fourth studio album by Slovene musician Tomaž Pengov. The third song Glažek vinčka contains lyrics by Frane Milčinski.

Track listing 
All songs written by Tomaž Pengov.
Side one
 "Obisk" – 4:49
 "Drevo" – 3:30
 "Glažek vinčka" – 2:56
 "Cesta" – 4:29
 "Dekle moje" – 3:20
 "Sojenice in klateži" – 3:23
 "Škrat Tom" – 4:41
 "Begunci" – 4:06
 "Pomisli" – 4:49
 "V neki loži" – 4:00
 "Gea" – 4:24

Personnel 
 Tomaž Pengov - guitar, 12 string lute, vocals, lyrics
 Borut Činč - flute, cello, harmonium, bass, piano, oboe, synthesizer, tuba, bass guitar, organ, electric guitar, contrabass, harpsichord, dulcimer, French horn, strings, engineer, producer
 Matjaž Sekne - viola
 Andrej Strmecki - drums, tam tam
 Lado Jakša - soprano saxophone, alto saxophone, clarinet, photography
 Peter Kordiš - design
 Milan Dekleva - liner notes
 Evald Flisar - translated liner notes

1996 albums
Tomaž Pengov albums